Fourth Height is a 1977 Soviet drama film directed by Igor Voznesensky.

Plot 
The film tells about the famous Soviet film actress, who in May 1942 voluntarily went to the front.

Cast 
 Margarita Sergeyecheva 
 Olga Ageyeva
 Larisa Luzhina
 Vladimir Puchkov
 Pavel Rudenskiy
 Vladimir Kotov
 Misha Shcherbakov
 Sergey Obrazov
 Yelena Berman
 Marina Gorlova

References

External links 
 

1977 films
1970s Russian-language films
Soviet drama films
1977 drama films